The 1926 Australasian Championships (now known as the Australian Open) was a tennis tournament that took place on outdoor Grass courts at the Memorial Drive, Adelaide, Australia from 23 January to 2 February. It was the 19th edition of the Australasian Championships, the 3rd held in Adelaide, and the first Grand Slam tournament of the year. The singles titles were won by Australians Jack Hawkes and Daphne Akhurst. 1926 was the last year the tournament would be called "Australasian Championships".

Finals

Men's singles

 Jack Hawkes defeated  Jim Willard  6–1, 6–3, 6–1

Women's singles

 Daphne Akhurst defeated  Esna Boyd  6–1, 6–3

Men's doubles

 Jack Hawkes /  Gerald Patterson   defeated  James Anderson /  Pat O'Hara Wood 6–1, 6–4, 6–2

Women's doubles

 Esna Boyd /  Meryl O'Hara Wood defeated  Daphne Akhurst /  Marjorie Cox 6–3, 6–8, 8–6

Mixed doubles

 Esna Boyd /  Jack Hawkes defeated  Daphne Akhurst /  Jim Willard 6–2, 6–4

External links
 Australian Open official website

 
1926 in Australian tennis
1926
January 1926 sports events
February 1926 sports events